Dufur School District #29 is a K-12 school district of approximately 280 students, in Dufur, Oregon, United States.

Academics
In 2008, 79% of the Dufur High School seniors received their high school diploma. Of 19 students, 15 graduated, 3 dropped out, and 1 received a modified diploma.

References

School districts in Oregon
Education in Wasco County, Oregon